4Frontiers Corporation is an American space commerce company, founded in 2005.

History
In 2014, 4Frontiers began a private placement round of financing to raise  to fund part of  required to build the first phase of INTERSPACE Florida, "a real science interactive space themed destination" on a  parcel of land near Titusville Cocoa Airport.

Organization
The company is headquartered in New Port Richey, Florida, and has three employees.  The majority of work is completed by contractors, consultants, and interns. Consultants and advisers for 4Frontiers include Buzz Aldrin, Ben Bova, Christopher McKay, and Marianne Dyson.

See also
Colonization of Mars
Exploration of Mars
Flashline Mars Arctic Research Station
Mars Analog Research Station Program

References

Further reading

External links
Official website
Space.com news article - "New Company Launches With Aim of Colonizing Mars"
Wired.com news article - "The Next Mother Lode: Mars"

Space colonization
Business services companies established in 2005
American companies established in 2005